Broccoli is an independent print magazine created by and for women who use cannabis. It is based in Portland, Oregon.

Although intended for cannabis users, Broccoli is an art and lifestyle magazine that bills itself as "playful, informed, eclectic, and thoughtful".

After the passage of the 2018 United States farm bill, Broccoli was the first organization to put cannabis in MoMA.

Origins
The magazine was founded by the former creative director of Kinfolk.  It was launched in November 2017.

See also
High Times

References

External links
Official Website

2017 establishments in Oregon
Cannabis magazines
Independent magazines
Lifestyle magazines published in the United States
Magazines established in 2017
Magazines published in Portland, Oregon
Women's magazines published in the United States